Kateřina Siniaková was the defending champion, but lost to Mathilde Johansson in the semifinals.

Johansson won the title, defeating Andreea Mitu in the final, 6–3, 6–4.

Seeds

Main draw

Finals

Top half

Bottom half

References 
 Main draw

Engie Open Nantes Atlantique - Singles